Celeribacter persicus is a Gram-negative and mesophilic bacterium from the genus of Celeribacter which has been isolated from sediments of a mangrove forest from the Nayband Bay from the Iranian Persian Gulf.

References

External links
Type strain of Celeribacter persicus at BacDive -  the Bacterial Diversity Metadatabase

Rhodobacteraceae
Bacteria described in 2016